Devil Bat's Daughter is a 1946 American horror film directed by Frank Wisbar. It stars Rosemary La Planche, who was crowned Miss America 1941. It is a sequel to the 1941 film The Devil Bat, with no returning cast members.

It marked the film debut of Michael Hale, a former ad man for the Los Angeles Times, who was married to one of Hedda Hopper's assistants.

Plot
A beautiful young woman is found in a trance. A taxi driver claims to have taken her to "the Carruthers place", so a police officer and neighbor Dr. Eliot take her there.

They learn, with help from psychiatrist Cliff Morris, that the woman is a Nina MacCarron, and that her father, Dr. Paul Carruthers, once conducted experiments on bats that led people to calling him a vampire and who died from his own creation in the events of the previous film.

As strange events occur leading to suspicion that Nina is mad, Ellen Morris, unhappy wife of Cliff, takes an interest in her, as does Ted Masters, who returns from the Army and falls in love with Nina. Together they prove that Cliff Morris is behind a diabolical plot.

Cast
 Rosemary La Planche as Nina
 Molly Lamont as Ellen
 John James as Ted
 Michael Hale as Morris
 Nolan Leary as Dr. Eliot

References

External links

1946 films
1946 horror films
Producers Releasing Corporation films
American horror films
Films directed by Frank Wisbar
American black-and-white films
1940s English-language films
1940s American films